The 1917 Minnesota Golden Gophers football team represented the University of Minnesota in the 1917 college football season. In their 18th year under head coach Henry L. Williams, the Golden Gophers compiled a 4–1 record (3–1 against Big Ten Conference opponents) and outscored their opponents by a combined total of 164 to 25.

The 1917 season was almost canceled due to the United States entering World War I, but over the summer, the decision was made to play a reduced football schedule.  The team finished second in the Big Ten.

Tackle George Hauser was named an All-American by the Associated Press. Hauser was also named All-Big Ten first team.

Schedule

References

Minnesota
Minnesota Golden Gophers football seasons
Minnesota Golden Gophers football